Newton of Ferintosh is a scattered crofting township on the Black Isle in the Highland council area of Scotland. It is between the villages of Tore and Maryburgh, alongside the A835 road.

References

Populated places on the Black Isle